Railways in Great Britain have a spotted history with heraldry. Though there are some examples of railway companies acquiring legitimate grants of arms from either the College of Arms or the Lyon Court, the majority of emblems simply copied the existing arms of the municipalities between which their routes ran, or used haphazard collections of quasi-heraldic imagery. Many encircled their insignia with buckles resembling those of orders of chivalry, such as that of the Order of the Garter, but with the name of the company in place of those orders' mottoes. Earlier railway companies frequently employed circular pictorial seals which occasionally included shields, crests or other elements from civic arms.

Post-Privatisation (1994-present)

British Railways (1948-1997)

The Big Four (1923-1947)

Pre-grouping (1830-1922)

Notable Individuals

Fictional

Notes

References
The North Eastern Railway; its rise and development by William  Weaver Tomlinson, 1915.

Armorials of the United Kingdom
Railway companies of the United Kingdom